Cyclin-G1 is a protein that in humans is encoded by the CCNG1 gene.

Function 

The eukaryotic cell cycle is governed by cyclin-dependent protein kinases (CDKs) whose activities are regulated by cyclins and CDK inhibitors. The protein encoded by this gene is a member of the cyclin family and contains the cyclin box. The encoded protein lacks the protein destabilizing (PEST) sequence that is present in other family members. Transcriptional activation of this gene can be induced by tumor protein p53. Two transcript variants encoding the same protein have been identified for this gene.

Interactions 

CCNG1 has been shown to interact with:
 Mdm2, 
 P16, 
 P53, and
 PPP2R4.

References

External links

Further reading